The Nowra Anglican College, (abbreviated as NAC), is an independent Anglican co-educational early learning, primary, and secondary day school, located on the corner of West Bunbera Street and the Princes Highway, in Bomaderry in the South Coast region of New South Wales, Australia. 
 
Established in 2000 as a Year K to Year 7 school, additional years were added with every year, and became Year K to Year 12 school in 2005. In 2009 the College took over the management of Bomaderry Community Preschool. It is a member school of the Sydney Anglican Schools Corporation, currently with over 860 students.

Nowra Anglican College was ranked as the leading School in the Shoalhaven in 2009 based on its outstanding NSW Higher School Certificate results. The college was placed 94th in the state.

Principals 
The following individuals served as Principal of Nowra Anglican College:

See also 

 List of Anglican schools in New South Wales
 Sydney Anglican Schools Corporation

References 

Educational institutions established in 2000
Anglican primary schools in New South Wales
Anglican secondary schools in New South Wales
Anglican Diocese of Sydney
Junior School Heads Association of Australia Member Schools
South Coast (New South Wales)
2000 establishments in Australia
Nowra, New South Wales